The Henry Covered Bridge is a historic covered bridge in Monongahela, Pennsylvania

It is designated as a historic bridge by the Washington County History & Landmarks Foundation.

References

External links
[ National Register nomination form]

Covered bridges on the National Register of Historic Places in Pennsylvania
Covered bridges in Washington County, Pennsylvania
Bridges completed in 1881
National Register of Historic Places in Washington County, Pennsylvania
Road bridges on the National Register of Historic Places in Pennsylvania
1881 establishments in Pennsylvania
Wooden bridges in Pennsylvania
Queen post truss bridges in the United States